Beeke is a Bantu language of uncertain affiliation. Guthrie assigned to the Nyali cluster. However, Ethnologue suggests that it may be a divergent form of Bali. It is 65% cognate with Bali, but 38% with the Nyali language Ndaka.

References

Nyali languages
Boan languages
Languages of the Democratic Republic of the Congo